Nancy is an American sitcom that aired on NBC during the 1970-1971 television season, with Renne Jarrett in the title role.

Synopsis
While Nancy Smith, daughter of the President of the United States, is vacationing in fictitious Center City, Iowa, she meets veterinarian Adam Hudson. Their romance struggles due to the constant surveillance of the Secret Service, Nancy's chaperone Abby, and Adam's uncle Everett, as well as the local press.

Cast
 Renne Jarrett as Nancy Smith
 John Fink as Adam Hudson
 Robert F. Simon as Everett McPherson
 Celeste Holm as Abby Townsend
 William Bassett as Agent Turner
 Ernesto Macias as Agent Rodriguez
Eddie Applegate as Willie Maxwell
 Frank Aletter as Tom Daily

Production notes
A Screen Gems Production, Nancy was a creation of producer Sidney Sheldon, who wrote every episode under various pseudonyms ["Mark Rowane", "Christopher Golato", "Allan Devon"].

Broadcast history
Nancy aired from September 17, 1970, to January 7, 1971, on Thursday in the 9:30 Eastern timeslot between Ironside and The Dean Martin Show. The competition was another sitcom, The Odd Couple, on ABC, and the second half-hour of the CBS Thursday Night Movies.

Promotion
 
In an effort to generate interest in Nancy, a novel based on the TV series was released at the same time as the show. Jarrett, Fink, and Holm also appeared on the cover of TV Guide, which coincided with the November 5, 1970 wedding episode. But it wasn't enough to generate viewer interest.

Episodes

Seventeen episodes of Nancy were broadcast before the shows cancellation.

References

External links 
 
 Television Obscurities - Nancy
 Nancy opening credits on YouTube
 Classic TV Archive - Nancy

1970 American television series debuts
1971 American television series endings
1970s American sitcoms
1970s American political comedy television series
NBC original programming
Television shows set in Iowa
Television shows set in Washington, D.C.
Television series by Sony Pictures Television
English-language television shows
Television series created by Sidney Sheldon
Television series by Screen Gems
White House in fiction